St John's College, Woodlawn, commonly abbreviated to Woodlawn, is a Roman Catholic co-educational secondary day school, located in the rural area of "Woodlawn" on the outskirts of Lismore, in the Northern Rivers region of New South Wales, Australia. The college is administered by the Catholic Education Office of the Diocese of Lismore.

In the city of Lismore the four largest industries by employment are the retail sector, health care, education and agriculture. St John's College, originally an agricultural secondary school, has a major part in two of these sectors and of course participates indirectly in the others as well. The school's name is often shortened to "Woodlawn" rather than being named fully. The school was founded by the Marists who continue to play a role in the running of the school. The first lay Rector (Principal) was Glenn Roff, appointed in 2001 when the Marist Fathers withdrew from St John's.

History 
St John's College, Woodlawn, was founded from St. Patrick's College, Wellington, New Zealand in 1931. The Marists who began the school themselves originated in France in the early 19th century.

St John's College was formally opened in 1931 as a Boarding and Day school on land which was donated by Margaret Buckley. The first rector of the school was Thomas Segrief S.M, Followed by Frs James Bell, John Kennedy, John Webber, Steven Maloney, Sid Mitchell, John Webber, Garry Reynolds, Lou Molloy, John Worthington, William Ryder, Ray Chapman – all priests of the Society of Mary and the current principal is Aaron Beach.

The college was described in the Northern Star on 25 May 1931:

For many years, St John was primarily a boarding school for boys. While most students came from country NSW, during the 1960s and 1970s, a substantial number of students came from Sabah, Malaysia.

The 75th anniversary 
St John's College Woodlawn celebrated its 75th anniversary in 2006. The college held many events throughout the year to celebrate, ranging from the first "Woodlawn Race Day", to "St John's Youth Day" and formal ceremonies. The opening of the renovated chapel was a central part of the ceremonies, with hundreds of alumni returning to be a part of the celebrations. After the Woodlawn Race Day (also known as the Woodlawn Cup), the college executive in association with the Parents and Friends executive decided to hold the day annually.

Houses
Carroll: Green – Bishop of Lismore Diocese at the time of Woodlawn's establishment
Segrief: Red – First rector of the college
Bell: Yellow – Second rector
Kennedy: Blue – Third rector

Significant days at Woodlawn

Opening Mass
The Opening Mass is the religious event marking the start of the new year. In recent years the Opening Mass has been held at the Lismore Cathedral to allow the entire school to attend and to include the Diocese in the events of the college. The Opening Mass also celebrates the new leaders in the College, the Prefects receive their badges of office, and the newly appointed students' representative council is inducted for the year.

College Swimming Carnival

It is regarded (by staff) as being the most exciting, engaged and fun night of the college. The four house colours are split, with the previous years' swimming carnival champions, usually Segrief, sitting opposite the other 3 houses and exchanging banter over the pool.

College Cross Country
The course varies between 3 and 5 Kilometres depending on year level and gender and also the time to beat varies, ranging from 30 to 40 minutes to earn extra points. The Cross Country is run over the rolling hills nearby and is easy to walk yet very challenging to run.

St John's Day
St John's day is the event where Year 12 takes control and has some fun with half the day dedicated to fun activities designed by Year 12s for the rest of the college to enjoy. The profits made from the events go back through the school in the fashion of the Year 12 gift at the end of their years.

Notable alumni
James Aubusson, NRL Sydney Roosters
Ben and Tom Cooper, cricketing brothers
Ian Donnelly, NRL Melbourne Storm
Jarred Ellis, AFL Gold Coast Suns
Matt King, NRL Melbourne Storm
Aden Ridgeway, Australian politician
Amos Roberts, NRL Sydney Roosters
Albert Torrens, NRL Manly Sea Eagles
Steven Hage, NRL Canterbury-Bankstown Bulldogs
Michael Gahan, ABL Adelaide Giants & Australian National Team
Nick Meaney, NRL Canterbury-Bankstown Bulldogs

See also 

 List of Catholic schools in New South Wales
 Catholic education in Australia

References

External links
 St John's College Woodlawn Website
 Woodlawns Yahoo Group; All Welcome
 Board of Studies Website
 Lismore Catholic Education Office

Educational institutions established in 1931
Catholic secondary schools in New South Wales
Northern Rivers
Lismore, New South Wales
Roman Catholic Diocese of Lismore
Association of Marist Schools of Australia
1931 establishments in Australia